
Gmina Dygowo is a rural gmina (administrative district) in Kołobrzeg County, West Pomeranian Voivodeship, in north-western Poland.

Villages
Gmina Dygowo contains the villages and settlements of Bardy, Czernin, Dębogard, Dygowo, Gąskowo, Jażdże, Jazy, Kłopotowo, Lisia Góra, Łykowo, Miechęcino, Piotrowice, Połomino, Pustary, Pyszka, Skoczów, Stojkowo, Stramniczka, Świelubie, Włościbórz and Wrzosowo.

Neighbouring gminas
Gmina Dygowo is bordered by the gminas of Będzino, Gościno, Karlino, Kołobrzeg and Ustronie Morskie.

References
Polish official population figures 2006

Dygowo
Kołobrzeg County